

CD information
Format: Compact Disc (06076899422)
Engineer: Adrian Irving; Kent Bryan
Stereo: Stereo
Pieces in Set: 1
Catalog #: 89942
Desc: Performer

Track listing 
 Are You With Me
 Many Things
 Knockin' On Heaven's Door
 Angel Heart
 Never Giving In
 Foot Soljah
 Jah Words
 Feed The World
 Why Should I
 Perfect Love
 Prophecy
 Cry For Justice
 Look Deep Within
 Angel
 In God Or Man

2005 albums
Luciano (singer) albums